The Minnesota Blue Ox were a professional roller hockey team based in Minneapolis, Minnesota, United States that played in Roller Hockey International.

History 
Formed in the wake of the Minnesota Arctic Blast, who played at Target Center in 1994, the Blue Ox joined RHI and were placed in the five-team Central Division (Buffalo Stampede, Chicago Cheetahs, Detroit Motor City Mustangs, St. Louis Vipers).

After a 13-11-0 regular season (second in the Central), Minnesota was the fourth-seed in the Eastern Conference playoffs. The Blue Ox were quickly eliminated in two games (best-of 3 series) by the fifth-seeded New Jersey Rockin' Rollers.

Season-by-season

See also
Minnesota Arctic Blast

 
Roller Hockey International teams
Sports clubs established in 1995
Sports in Minneapolis
1995 establishments in Minnesota
Sports clubs disestablished in 1999
1999 disestablishments in Minnesota